
Anghel is a Romanian family name and given name

Surname 
 Andrei Anghel
 Atanasie Anghel
 Bianca Anghel
 Catalin Anghel
 Dimitrie Anghel
 Itai Anghel
 Luminiţa Anghel
 Monica Anghel

Given name 
 Anghel Andreescu
 Anghel Demetriescu
 Anghel Iordănescu
 Anghel Nour
 Anghel Saligny

Others 
 Anghel Saligny Bridge
 Anghel Saligny metro station

See also 
 Angel (disambiguation)
 Angela (disambiguation)
 Angeli (disambiguation)
 Angelo (disambiguation)

Romanian masculine given names
Romanian-language surnames